The First Lad is a 1958 Soviet drama film directed by Sergei Parajanov.

Plot 
Sergeant Danila returns to his native village, where he organizes the construction of the stadium to make life in the village a bit more interesting, and Yushka, nicknamed “The First Lad”, becomes the first football player...

Cast 
 Tamara Alexeeva
 Andrei Andrienko-Zemskov	
 Varvara Chayka as The Mother of Odarka
 Grigori Karpov as Yushka
 Yelena Kovalenko
 Mikhail Kramar
 Yuriy Satarov as Danila
 Nikolay Shutko
 Lyudmila Sosyura as Odarka

References

External links 
 
 Первый парень on Kinopoisk

1958 films
1950s Russian-language films
Soviet drama films
1958 drama films